Ukumari (Quechua for bear or spectacled bear) may refer to:
 Ukumari (Inca warrior)
 A regional park in Colombia
 Another name for the spectacled bear